George Sheehan may refer to:

 George A. Sheehan (1918–1993), writer about the sport of running
 George Sheehan (footballer), Irish soccer player during the 1890s and early 20th century